Acalyptris vannieukerkeni is a moth of the family Nepticulidae. It was described by Puplesis in 1994. It is known from Turkmenistan.

References

Nepticulidae
Endemic fauna of Turkmenistan
Moths of Asia
Moths described in 1994